House Husbands is an Australian television comedy-drama, created by writers Ellie Beaumont and Drew Proffit. It centres on four families where the fathers – Lewis (Gary Sweet), Mark (Rhys Muldoon), Kane (Gyton Grantley) and Justin (Firass Dirani) – are in charge of raising the children. The first ten-part series premiered on the Nine Network on 2 September 2012. The drama set a ratings record for the network and became Australia's most watched television show. On 23 September, it was announced that Nine had renewed House Husbands for a second season. It began airing from 8 April 2013. A third season was broadcast in 2014 and fourth began airing from 10 August 2015.

Series overview

Episodes

Series 1 (2012)

Series 2 (2013)

Series 3 (2014)

Series 4 (2015)

Series 5 (2017)

Ratings

References

External links
 List of House Husbands episodes at Ninemsn

Lists of Australian comedy television series episodes
Lists of Australian drama television series episodes